Augustus L. Hart (October 15, 1849 – 1901) was the 13th Attorney General of California.

Birth
Augustus L. Hart was born in Indiana on October 15, 1849.

Politics
Hart believed that it is necessary to empower the rights of the people of California and it was derived from the equal protection of the law.

Quotes
"if she will ever maintain the rights of the poor as the rights of the rich; will ever look to the interest of the laboring classes, the men whose property, though small in degree to them, are equal to those of the richer classes. She will maintain their rights and will maintain the rights of the agriculturalists, maintain the rights of the mechanics, the farmers, the lawyers and all-extending equality to all her people the entire extent of her domain...."

Death
Augustus L. Hart died in Livermore, California in 1901.

References

External links
Brief biography with picture

1849 births
1901 deaths
California Attorneys General